Ibrahim Efendiu (1850, Shijak, Sanjak of Scutari, Ottoman Empire - 1930, Shijak, Albania), also known as Ali Shahin, was a 19th-century Albanian politician. He was one of the delegates of the Albanian Declaration of Independence.

References

19th-century Albanian people
20th-century Albanian people
1930 deaths
1850 births
People from Shijak
All-Albanian Congress delegates